Antti Markus Miettinen (born July 3, 1980) is a Finnish ice hockey coach and former professional forward, who last played professionally with HPK of the Liiga. He had previously played in the National Hockey League (NHL) for the Dallas Stars, Minnesota Wild and Winnipeg Jets.

Playing career

Miettinen was drafted by the Dallas Stars as their seventh-round pick, 224th overall, in the 2000 NHL Entry Draft. Prior to playing in the NHL, he played for five years in the SM-Liiga with HPK Hämeenlinna picking up the Kultainen kypärä and the Lasse Oksanen trophy in his final year in Finland.

Miettinen spent two-years in the American Hockey League (AHL) before playing his first full season in the NHL in the 2005–06 season with the Stars. He was chosen to play for Finland in the 2006 Winter Olympics but was unable to participate due to an upper body injury. He was replaced on the team by Stars teammate Niklas Hagman.

On July 3, 2008, Miettinen signed a 3-year $7 million contract with the Minnesota Wild. When that contract ended, he moved to the Kontinental Hockey League (KHL). On December 12, 2011, Miettinen agreed on a two-year deal to return to the NHL with the Tampa Bay Lightning. However, the following day he was claimed off re-entry waivers by the Winnipeg Jets.

A free agent at the conclusion of his two-year contract with the Jets, Miettinen once again left the NHL and signed a one-year contract with Swiss club HC Fribourg-Gottéron of the National League A on July 22, 2013. In the 2013–14 season, Miettinen was hampered again by injury but posted a credible 7 goals and 22 points in 34 games with Fribourg. After one season in Germany, he returned to HPK for one final season before retiring and becoming an assistant coach with the club.

Personal life
Miettinen is currently in a band named Cement, formed by Miettinen and a few friends. He plays the guitar and has written a few songs with the band. Although not very widely known, they did get one gig—at his wedding.

He has a son, Noel, who was born in December 2009 and a daughter named Olivia, who was born in 2011.

Awards
2002–03 SM-Liiga Kultainen kypärä
2002–03 SM-Liiga Lasse Oksanen trophy

Career statistics

Regular season and playoffs

International

References

External links

1980 births
Living people
Dallas Stars draft picks
Dallas Stars players
Eisbären Berlin players
Finnish ice hockey right wingers
HC Fribourg-Gottéron players
Hamilton Bulldogs (AHL) players
HPK players
Ice hockey players at the 2010 Winter Olympics
Medalists at the 2010 Winter Olympics
Minnesota Wild players
Olympic bronze medalists for Finland
Olympic ice hockey players of Finland
Olympic medalists in ice hockey
People from Hämeenlinna
Utah Grizzlies (AHL) players
Winnipeg Jets players
Sportspeople from Kanta-Häme